STILLEN (Steve Millen Sportparts, Inc.) is the automotive aftermarket parts company created by Steve Millen, a former racecar driver for Nissan who was known for racing the 300ZX. In 1986, STILLEN began selling mini-truck ground effects and then began fulfilling orders for vans and full-sized trucks. However, STILLEN became known for specializing in parts for Nissan cars, but also supplies parts for other vehicles such as the Ford GT and Toyota 86. STILLEN also develops parts for other cars such as the Chevrolet Camaro and Ford F150 (including Ford Raptor).  In 1996, STILLEN purchased a machining shop from Frank Shuter, a former New Zealand speedway champion.

The company became quite popular with the production of its STILLEN exhaust and has continued expanding their line of performance parts. Today, they offer a line of superchargers, cold air intakes, and body kits for sports cars, American performance cars and trucks. 

The company's latest completed project, the STILLEN R35 GT-R, involved modifying a standard Nissan GT-R, enabling it to go from 0–100 km/h in 2.9 seconds, instead of the usual 3.6 seconds. The car was designed mainly for Targa Newfoundland. The modifications included removal of significant weight, chip & computer tuning, new harder suspension system and carbon brakes.

See also
 Steve Millen

References

External links
 Stillen website
 STILLEN performance shop

Manufacturing companies of the United States
Automotive motorsports and performance companies
Companies based in Costa Mesa, California